Aglet is a 2020 augmented reality mobile game, developed and published by onlife Inc. Similar to Pokémon Go, it encourages players to spend time outside in order to earn rewards. Developed by onlife co-founders CEO Ryan David Mullins and Owen Batt, Aglet was released in April 2020.

Gameplay
“Aglet” is a free-to-play augmented reality mobile game. By walking or running around the physical world, players are rewarded with Aglet that they can then use to collect digital sneakers. As sneakers are collected, they can be equipped to provide the wearer with different attributes and abilities as they explore the world. Actively worn sneakers wear out over time, but players can check in to “repair” or “deadstock” stations in their area to repair their sneakers and return them to looking new. Players can display any sneakers they aren't actively wearing on their Shelf.

Players can also complete location-based challenges by walking or running through their real-life surroundings. While exploring, players can find Treasure Stashes that contain sneakers and in-game currency.

Aglet debuted its first NFT-based features in early 2022. These in-game features were followed in May 2022 by the launch of the Aglet One, a real-life sneaker paired with a corresponding NFT. Currency earned in-game can be used to purchase Aglet's NFTs.

Development

Release 
As reported by VentureBeat, Aglet reached 3.5 million active users as of July 2022.

Reception

Awards

References

External links

2020 video games
Android (operating system) games
Augmented reality games
Free-to-play video games
IOS games
Location-based games
Video games developed in the United States
Vertically-oriented video games